Raymond Victorien Ndong Ndong (born March 23, 1988, in Douala) is a professional Cameroonian  footballer who is currently free agent.

Trivia 
He began his career by AS Bebe Douala before later transferred to Cotonsport Garoua. In 2008, he left Cotonsport Garoua.

External links
Profile and Pictures - www.cotonsport.com

1988 births
Living people
Cameroonian footballers
Coton Sport FC de Garoua players
Association football midfielders